Papazkarası, also Papaskara ("priest's black"), is a Turkish grape variety and a Turkish wine grown in the Marmara and Central Anatolia regions of Turkey. This variety was used to make a red wine blend with Cinsaut. The wine has an alcohol ratio between 11 and 13%, and an acidity range of 6 to 8 grams/liter. Papaskarası is also registered in Greece as Kara Papas. It is a very old Thracian varietal and probably the best winegrape cultivar in Turkey. Kirklareli Uskup region is known as the best terroir for Papaskarası. Uskup terroir is based on Strandja decomposed granites, which gives very low yields and small bunches of grapes. In the fertile lowlands, the bunches can be much heavier, at around 500 grams per bunch. Verasion time occurs between mid August and late August at Uskup.  The wine can be blended with Cabernet Sauvignon and Merlot. Maturity period is very late between mid October and mid November. Total Growing degree-day required is around 1.890 GDD . Papaskarası gives very high acidity to wines. In very ripe years, it can reach to 25 brix levels in the lowland Thracian vineyards of Uzunköprü.

Ampelographers believe that Papaskarası is native to the Balkan peninsula and was probably the result of a natural cross between Prokupac and Alba imputotato. Prokupac has been growing in Serbia and Macedonia since at least the 5th century, when it was first mentioned, so the cross between Prokupac and Alba Imputptato would have had to occur sometime after the 5th century. The authors also suggest that Papazkarası is one of the parents of the Kadarka grape.

See also
 Boğazkere
 Çalkarası
 Kalecik Karası
 Öküzgözü

References

Further reading
 Hayyam.com - Red wine grape varieties grown in Turkey 
 Paul, Robert. Viticulture and Winemaking in Turkey. The Australian & New Zealand Wine Industry Journal. 2006.
http://www.ampelis.it/1.pdf

Grape varieties of Turkey
Turkish words and phrases
Red wine grape varieties